Joseph Pé (1 December 1891 – 31 October 1980) was a Belgian racing cyclist. He rode in the 1924 Tour de France.

References

1891 births
1980 deaths
Belgian male cyclists
Place of birth missing